Don Walsh (25 August 1934 – 2 March 2016) was an Australian rules footballer who played for the Collingwood Football Club in the Victorian Football League (VFL).

Notes

External links 

1934 births
2016 deaths
Australian rules footballers from Victoria (Australia)
Collingwood Football Club players